Álvaro Valles Rosa (born 25 July 1997) is a Spanish footballer who plays for UD Las Palmas as a goalkeeper.

Club career
Born in La Rinconada, Seville, Andalusia, Valles finished his formation with Real Betis. He made his senior debut with the reserves on 16 October 2016, starting in a 3–0 Tercera División away win against CD Guadalcacín.

On 6 September 2017, after being rarely used, Valles was loaned to CD Gerena of the fourth division, for one year. On 10 July of the following year, he moved to another reserve team, UD Las Palmas Atlético of the Segunda División B.

Vallés made his first-team debut for the Canarians on 13 October 2019, playing the full 90 minutes in a 3–0 home defeat of Deportivo de La Coruña in the Segunda División. He subsequently established himself as a starter for the main squad under Pepe Mel, overtaking fellow youth graduate Josep Martínez and Raúl Fernández.

References

External links
 
 Beticopedia profile 
 
 

1997 births
Living people
People from Vega del Guadalquivir
Sportspeople from the Province of Seville
Spanish footballers
Footballers from Andalusia
Association football goalkeepers
Segunda División players
Segunda División B players
Tercera División players
Betis Deportivo Balompié footballers
UD Las Palmas Atlético players
UD Las Palmas players